Bohumír Bartoněk (born 10 May 1939) is a former international speedway rider from Czechoslovakia.

Speedway career 
Bartoněk reached the final of the Speedway World Team Cup in the 1960 Speedway World Team Cup, he won a bronze medal despite not riding because he was the official reserve rider. He was twice a Continental Speedway Finalist in 1959 and 1961.

World final appearances

World Team Cup
 1960 -  Göteborg, Ullevi (with František Richter / Luboš Tomíček Sr. / Antonín Kasper Sr.) - 3rd - 15pts (dnr)
 1961 -  Wrocław, Olympic Stadium (with Antonín Kasper Sr. / Stanislav Svoboda / Luboš Tomíček Sr.) - 4th - 1pts (7)
 1962 -  Slaný (with Bedřich Slaný / Karel Průša / Jaroslav Volf / Luboš Tomíček Sr.) - 4th - 16pts (0)

References 

1939 births
Living people
Czech speedway riders